Round Oak railway station was a station on the Oxford-Worcester-Wolverhampton Line serving the town of Brierley Hill in England.

History
It was opened in 1852 to serve the town of Brierley Hill. Two railways/routes served the station - originally the Oxford, Worcester and Wolverhampton Railway and the South Staffordshire Railway, which later became the Great Western Railway and London, Midland and Scottish Railway (through amalgamation of the London and North Western Railway) respectively.

Accident 

In 1858 a coupling broke on an excursion train at the station and the rear portion rolled back down the gradient from Round Oak railway station towards Brettell Lane where it collided with another train (which was actually part of the same excursion, the train already having been safely divided once due to its extreme length!) 14 passengers were killed and 50 more injured.

Closure 

British Railways closed the station pre-Beeching in 1962 and plans for a freight use were abandoned at the same time.  Goods trains continue to pass the site for a few hundred yards northwards, to Round Oak Steel Terminal.

West Midlands Metro
A £1,100,000/15-year-long regeneration project will see the station become part of the local tram network with the line reopening between Walsall, Dudley Port railway station, Dudley railway station and the Merry Hill Shopping Centre for trams on one track and for freight on the other. The freighters would continue on past Brettell Lane railway station and on to the mainline at Stourbridge junction. The closed section of railway through Dudley was expected to re-open during the 2010s, as a combined Midland Metro tramway and a heavy rail line for goods trains.

It was set to re-open as a through route in 2012, to run alongside the second phase of the Midland Metro - though it is expected that trams will diverge from the line at around the location of Harts Hill. As at October 2012 no announcement had been made when the construction work will commence.

References

Further reading

Disused railway stations in Dudley
Railway stations in Great Britain opened in 1852
Railway stations in Great Britain closed in 1962
Brierley Hill
Former Great Western Railway stations
1852 establishments in England